Ar Men ("the rock" in Breton) is a lighthouse at one end of the Chaussée de l'Île de Sein, at the west end of Brittany. It shares its name with the rock on which it was erected between 1867 and 1881. It is a listed monument since 2017.

Ar Men is one of the best known lighthouses because of its isolated situation and the considerable difficulties its construction has presented, and the danger in evacuating its personnel.  Considered one of the most challenging workplaces by the community of lighthouse keepers, it has been named "The Hell of Hells" because of the severe conditions and exposure to the Atlantic.

History
In 1825, the need for a light built on one of the reefs of the Chaussee de Sein was already recognized, but it was thought impracticable to build. A commission was appointed in 1860 to look at the possibility of building a light, and after six years reported that a lighthouse should be constructed on the Ar Men. Despite the estimated  of rock being uncovered at low water, work began in 1867. In the first year of work, workmen were able to land on the rock on only seven occasions and could spend a total of just eight hours drilling holes for the foundation. At high tide the rock is completely submerged.

 Hours worked on the Ar Men lighthouse

In the following twenty years the tower was improved and reinforced. Keepers staffed Ar Men in 30-day shifts until automation. A two-way rope sling from the supply boat was used to transfer people to Ar Men. The lighthouse-keepers of the next shift were hoisted up before the outgoing keepers were brought down.

The light was automated and electrified on 10 April 1990, with a 250 watt halogen lamp. Its signal is three white flashes every twenty seconds, with an accompanying signal of three sounds every sixty seconds.

Generally the lighthouse is accessible only by helicopter or by boat if the seas permit.

See also

 List of lighthouses in France

References
 Ar-Men, the most symbolic lighthouse at sea
 Construction of a lighthouse : Ar Men

Lighthouses completed in 1881
Buildings and structures in Finistère
Lighthouses in Brittany
Monuments historiques of Finistère
1881 establishments in France